Uraecha yunnana is a species of beetle in the family Cerambycidae. It was described by Judson Linsley Gressitt in 1942. It is known from China.

References

Lamiini
Beetles described in 1942